The Carlos Palanca Memorial Awards for Literature winners in the year 1998 (rank, title of winning entry, name of author):


English division
Short story
First prize: "Touch" lakambini story

Second prize: "What I Love Or Will Remember Most About High School" by Vicente G. Groyon III
Third prize: "Door 59" by Felisa Batacan

Poetry
First prize: "White Sill" by John Labella
Second prize: "Shiva in Profile" by Marc Escalona Gaba
Third prize: "15 Rhapsodies" by Aida Santos

Short story for children
First prize: "The Brothers Wu and The Good Luck Eel" by Fran Ng
Second prize: "Nico's Flight" by Luis Joaquin Katigbak
Third prize: "Masks" by Honoel Ibardolaza

Essay
First prize: "A Dogged Defense Against Dogmatism of Doggone Dogooders" by Rolando Loredo
Second prize: "Departures" by Priscilla Macansantos
Third prize: "Queen of The Orient: Vignettes About Mama" by Ronald Baytan

Full Length Play
First prize: No winner
Second prize: No winner
Third prize: "The Day Philippine Military Honor was Savaged" by Felix Clemente

One-act play
First prize: No winner
Second prize: "My Mommie Dearest" by Jeanne Lim
Third prize: "The Sun Shines In The Dark" by Elmo Famador

Filipino division
Short story in Filipino
First prize: "Ipanalangin Mo Siya, Ipanalangin Mo Kami" by Evelyn Sebastian
Second prize: "Anino Sa Buhangin" by Edgar Maranan
Third prize: "Aripuen" by Reynaldo A. Duque

Poetry in Filipino
First prize: "Pagtingala: Pananahan At Paglalayag Sa Mga Tula ng Lagalag" by Rebecca Añonuevo
Second prize: "Ako, Bana, Ama" by Michael Coroza
Third prize: "Kuwadernong Rosas ng Pagdating at Paglisan" by Raymund Magno-Garlitos

Short story for children in Filipino
First prize: "Si Tanya, Ang Uwak Na Gustong Pumuti" by German Gervacio
Second prize: "Sa Ilalim ng Dagat" by Augie Rivera Jr.
Third prize: "Dalawang Lumang Saklay" by Remigio Alvarez Alva

Essay in Filipino
First prize: "Sa Pagdapo ng Paroparo" by Luna Sicat
Second prize: "Ang Birhen ng Peñafrancia at South Border: Isang Personal Na Repleksiyon sa Pagtatanghal ng Spectacle ng Pagsalat" by Roland Tolentino
Third prize: "Dyipni" by Domingo Landicho

Full-length play in Filipino
First prize: No winner
Second prize: No winner
Third prize: "Padre de Familia" by Lito Casaje

One-act play in Filipino
First prize: "Ma-Te!" by Abel Molina
Second prize: "Digma" by Roel S. Ang
Third prize: No winner

Teleplay
First prize: "Salubong" ni Rene O. Villanueva
Second prize: "Ang Repleksyon ni Miss Trajano" ni Layeta P. Bucoy
Third prize: "Makina" ni Mes de Guzman

Screenplay<
First prize: "Azucena" by Enrique Ramos
Second prize: "KBL (Kasal, Binyag, Libing)" by Oskar Monje
Third prize: "Nokturnal" by Lito Casaje

Iloko short story
First prize: "Dagiti Ulep Iti Arinunos Ti Abril" by Ricarte Agnes
Second prize: "Wayawaya" by Aurelio Agcaoili
Third prize: "Dagiti Banias Iti Alintatao ni Pasintawi Gagan-ayan, Gagangay Nga Umili" by Reynaldo Duque

Cebuano short story
First prize: "Aron Usbon ang Kalibotan" by Ricardo Patalinhug
Second prize: "Ang Nagharag Nga Balite" by Mario Batausa
Third prize: "Ang Baybayon Ni Simon" by Ernesto Lariosa

Hiligaynon short story
First prize: "Lirio" by Peter Solis Nery
Second prize: "Tugalbong" by Leoncio Deriada
Third prize: "May Lago, Manong Eddie" by Alfonso Hiponia

More winners by year

References
 

1998
Palanca Awards, 1998